Michael Kenny may refer to:
Michael Kenny (boxer) (born 1964), New Zealand boxer
Michael Kenny (sculptor) (1941–1999), English sculptor
Michael Kenny (political scientist), professor of public policy at the University of Cambridge
Michael Daedalus Kenny, comic book illustrator, storyboard artist and director
Michael Hughes Kenny (1937–1995), Roman Catholic bishop of Juneau, Alaska
Mick Kenny (Galway hurler) (1893–1959), played in the 1910s and 1920s
Mike Kenny (swimmer) (born 1945), British Paralympic swimmer
Michael Kenny, character in Sister Kenny

See also
Mike Kenny (writer), British playwright
Mick Kenny (Kilkenny hurler) (died 2003), played in the 1950s, Irish name Mícheál Ó Cionnaith
Michael Kenney of Iron Maiden
Mick Kenney (born 1980), English musician, artist, and producer